Brian Wilson (born May 23, 1982) is a former professional tennis player from the United States.

Career
Wilson played collegiate tennis for the University of Illinois. He earned All-American selection as both a singles and doubles player during his college career. In 2003 he was a member of the team which won the NCAA Championships and he was also the doubles champion, partnering Rajeev Ram. It was with Ram that he took part in the men's doubles at the 2003 US Open, where they were beaten in the first round by Robby Ginepri and Bobby Reynolds.
 
On the ATP Tour, Wilson had his best performance at the 2006 SAP Open in San Jose, California, beating Ivo Karlović, then 61st in the world.

After making his way through qualifying, he made his Grand Slam singles debut in the 2007 Australian Open. He lost in the opening round to Feliciano López, in four sets.

ATP Challenger and ITF Futures finals

Singles: 5 (4–1)

Doubles: 28 (17–11)

References

External links 
 
 

1982 births
Living people
American male tennis players
Illinois Fighting Illini men's tennis players
Tennis people from California